Tiquilia darwinii is a species of plant in the family Boraginaceae. It is endemic to Ecuador.

References

darwinii
Endemic flora of Ecuador
Least concern plants
Taxonomy articles created by Polbot